The current Chinese Ambassador to Japan is the official representative of the People's Republic of China to Japan. 

During the Qing dynasty, the Chinese envoy held the rank of Resident minister. When the Qing dynasty fell in 1912, the Republic of China (1912–1949) was the officially recognized government of China, which upgraded the role to Ambassador in 1936. 

When the Kuomintang government fell following the Chinese Civil War, Japan, along with the rest of the world continued to recognize the KMT government in exile as the legitimate government of China until the United Nations passed Resolution 2758 in 1972, recognizing the People's Republic of China as the de jure government of the region.

Due to the current Political status of Taiwan, consular services with Taiwan are currently administered through the Taipei Economic and Cultural Representative Office in Japan.

List of representatives

Resident Minster of the Qing dynasty
 Ho Ju-Chang, 1876-1877
 Hsu Ching-cheng (許景澄), 1880-1881
 Li Shu-Chang, 1881-1884
 Hsu Cheng-Tsu, 1884-1887
 Li Shu-Chang, 1887-1890
 Li Ching-Fang (李經方), 1890-1892
 Wang Feng-Tsao, 1892-1894
 Yu Keng, 1895-1898
 Li Cheng-To, 1898-1901
 Tsai Tiao, 1901-1903
 Yang Shu, 1903-1907
 Li Chia-Chu, 1907-1908
 Hu Wei-Te (胡惟德), 1908-1910
 Wang Ta-Hsieh (汪大燮). 1910-1913

Resident Minster of the Republic of China (1912–1949)
 Ma Ting-Liang, 1913 (chargé d'affaires)
 Lu Tsung-Yu, 1913-1916
 Chang Tsung-Hsiang, 1916-1919 (charge d'affairs)
 Chuang Ching-Ko, 1919-1920 
 Hu Wei-Te (胡惟德), 1920-1922
 Ma Ting-Liang, 1922 (charge d'affairs)

Ambassador of the Republic of China (1912–1949)

Ambassador of Taiwan (until 1972)

Ambassador of the People's Republic of China

See also
 China–Japan relations

References 

 
Japan
China